Frank Heiss (July 24, 1971 – April 15, 2018) was an American electronic record producer best known by his alias HEISS. He previously toured and/or recorded under the aliases as tube, HearNow,  Bionic Harmonic,  and The Hick Step Massive.

Heiss has released a large number of LPs, EPs, singles, and remixes, and in 2013 released the original album Ascensio(N), which Lost in Sound described as spiritual in tone, stating that "each track is stylistically unique. Heiss weaves through styles...from jazz fusion to drum n bass to reggae, and everything in between." The following year he released the remix album Awaken(D), featuring guest artists such as D.V.S*. Heiss was the owner of the record label Transcendent Tunes, which features music by future bass producers who seek a connection to the Divine.

Early life, education

He heard the hardcore dance music popular in the UK,

Music career

Early years
In 1995, Heiss released the electronic EP Radical Technology under his full name on Rising High Records in the United Kingdom. This was followed in 1996 by the EP Flashdancers On Acid, a collaboration with Dr. Walker that was released on Sm:)e Communications in New York City. In the mid-1990s he also signed a recording contract with the New York City label Liquid Sky Music, under the moniker 'tube.' This was during the rise of American rave culture.

In 1998 while performing in and around Cologne, Germany another recording contract was established under the moniker HearNow, this time with Harvest/EMI - the label once home to Pink Floyd, Soft Machine and Deep Purple. In 1999, he toured as tube with the "To The Planet's Edge" tour in support of the Leeds UK goth band The Sisters Of Mercy.

The next phase in the career was a period of reflection and primarily studio only output. During this time that he wrote for and licensed music to a variety of television shows including One Life to Live,  All My Children, and General Hospital. He also began his country/breakbeat mashup project known as The Hick Step Massive.

Releases as HEISS
Awake(N)
After the hiatus from music and the tour lifestyle, Heiss decided to stop using multiple monikers and simply go Heiss, or HEISS. He has stated, "I settled on 'HEISS' because it... encompasses everything I do under myself, with no leaning towards any specific genre or style." Making a return to live performance in 2012, HEISS released the full-length album Awake(N). In a review about the style, "Awake(N) is a 12-track compilation of electronic originals caked with a thick layer of hip-hop and instrumental influences. As you venture further into the album you start to become more familiar with his cohesive blend of glitch hop and breakbeat styles which are consistently paralleled with instrumental backdrops."  Awake(N) was followed by a series of singles; "The Captive Mind" featuring Soham, "Jivanmukta," and "Svadu."

Ascensio(N)
His full-length album Ascensio(N) was released on November 12, 2013. According to The Untz, "there is an underlying tone of spiritual downtempo on all twelve tracks." A review by Lost in Sound stated, "In this most recent endeavor, he continues to narrate the spiritual journey he began to describe in 2012′s Awake(N)." Also, "Positive and conscious lyrics are interspersed throughout the album," with Heiss writing and singing some of them himself. Others lyrics were contributed by guests artists, including emcees Jackson Whalan, Soham, singer Falu, and multi-instrumentalist Michael Garfield. About the style, "while there is an underlying musical and lyrical feeling holding the entire collection together, each track is stylistically unique. Heiss weaves through styles, hinting at a wide variety of genres, from jazz fusion to drum n bass to reggae, and everything in between."

Awaken(D) remix album
With the name HEISS he founded the Transcendent Tunes, which focuses on "sacred bass music." Heiss has stated, "I don’t want the label to focus solely on bass music, or glitch, or any specific style, but music that emphasizes the betterment of the human soul and spirit." The first album on the label was Awaken(D), released on April 14, 2014.

Awaken(D) is an album of remixes by D.V.S* Skytree, Supersillyus, Soulacybin, Living Light, Push/Pull, Futexture, Erothyme and others. According to a review in Lost in Sound, "AThere’s no place for genres in this album – it’s an exploration of countless rhythms, BPM’s, and frequencies. Awaken(D) truly is a magical collection of sacred bass music." From the album TrustTheBrain.com selected the Supersillyus remix of Heiss' track "Drop the Fuss" as one of its Top 7 Tracks Out This Week.

Style, equipment
HEISS incorporated a wide variety of styles, not settling into a specific genre. However, he frequently used the stylings of genres including IDM, jungle, downtempo, hip hop, breaks, and acid. He used both analog and digital musical equipment.

Personal life
Heiss died unexpectedly on April 15, 2018.

Discography

Albums

EPs

Singles

Remixes
Frank Heiss remixes of material by other artists.
1997: "Abducted" by DJ Soul Slinger (tube Remix)
 1999: "Flow Motion" by Can from the album Sacrilege (Air Liquide Remix) - production
 2000: "Electro Organic Sound System" by Percussive Wave (Frank Heiss Remix)
 2012: "Gunsligin Rambler" by Gangstagrass (The Hick Step Massive Remix)
 2013: "Keep It Sacred, Keep It Safe" by Skytree (HEISS Remix)
 2014: "Ecliptic Mystic" by Living Light (HEISS Remix)
 2014: "The Silly Revolution" by Supersillyus (HEISS Remix)

Further reading
Discographies
Frank Heiss at Discogs
Writing
"Confessions of a Hardware Junkie" by Frank Heiss (Lost in Sound, May 4, 2013)	
"Confessions – Known, Loved, and Lost ‘The MPC-3000′" by Frank Heiss (Lost in Sound, June 25, 2013)	
"Confessions – Mostly, Battery Operated Devices" by Frank Heiss (Lost in Sound, March 6, 2014)	

Interviews

References

External links

HEISS on Bandcamp
HEISS on SoundCloud

1971 births
2018 deaths
Record producers from Massachusetts